The Journal of African History (JAH) is a triannual peer-reviewed academic journal. It was established in 1960 and is published by Cambridge University Press. It was among the first specialist journals to be devoted to African history and archaeology and was founded by John Fage and Roland Oliver. As stated on the journal's website:

{{blockquote|The Journal of African History (JAH) publishes articles and book reviews ranging widely over the African past, from ancient times to the present. Historical approaches to all time periods are welcome. The thematic range is equally broad, covering social, economic, political, cultural, and intellectual history. Recent articles have explored diverse themes including: labour and class, gender and sexuality, health and medicine, ethnicity and race, migration and diaspora, nationalism and state politics, religion and ritual, and technology and the environment.}}

The current editors are Professor Shane Doyle University of Leeds, UK, Professor Dan Magaziner Yale University, USA, Professor Marissa Moorman Indiana University Bloomington, USA, and Professor Moses Ochonu Vanderbilt University, USA''.

Abstracting and indexing 
The journal is abstracted and indexed in:

According to the official website, the journal has a 2015 impact factor of 0.857.

References 
[1]

External links 

 

African history journals
Cambridge University Press academic journals
English-language journals
Triannual journals
Publications established in 1960